Harbinger of Metal is a 74-minute EP by Finnish doom metal band Reverend Bizarre that was released in 2003. It was released on double vinyl in 2009 by Svart Records. Although considered an extended play by the band, the release is referred to as an album by some sources.

Track listing

Personnel
 Albert Witchfinder - bass guitar and vocals
 Peter Vicar - guitar
 Earl of Void - guitar and drums

References

Reverend Bizarre albums
2003 EPs
Season of Mist albums